"Thirty Days (To Come Back Home)", also written "30 Days", is a 1955 song and chart single by Chuck Berry. Berry wrote "30 Days" to pay tribute to Hank Williams' country music.

Covers
The song has been covered by many artists, including:

Ernest Tubb, 1955
Ronnie Hawkins & The Hawks as "Forty Days", 1959. (#4 Canada, July 6, 1959)
Cliff Richard & The Shadows as "Forty Days", 1961.
Bill Black And His Combo, 1964
The Tractors, 1995

References

1955 songs
Chuck Berry songs
Songs written by Chuck Berry